Deudorix isocrates (sometimes Virachola isocrates), the common guava blue, is a butterfly in the family Lycaenidae. It was described by Johan Christian Fabricius in 1793. It is  found  in India, Sri Lanka and Indochina in the Indomalayan realm. Other common names include pomegranate butterfly, and anar butterfly.

The larvae feed on Randia dumetorum, Eriobotrya japonica, Psidium guajava, Tamarindus indica, Strychnos nux-vomica and Gardenia latifolia. It is a pest of pomegranates in India.

Description

References

External links
"Deudorix Hewitson, 1863" at Markku Savela's Lepidoptera and Some Other Life Forms

Deudorix
Butterflies described in 1793
Deudorigini
Agricultural pest insects
Butterflies of Asia